Harry Milanzi (born 13 March 1978) is a former Zambian footballer who played as a striker.

Early life
Milanzi, did his primary education at Regiment Primary School and then proceeded to Kabulonga Boys Secondary School.

Career
He was part of the Zambian 2006 African Nations Cup team, who finished third in group C in the first round of competition, thus failing to secure qualification for the quarter-finals.

In 2015, Milanzi was appointed interim assistant manager of NAPSA Stars alongside Geoffrey Hamakwenda.

Doping ban
In 2005, Milanzi was banned for 6 six months after he tested positive for cannabis in a doping control.

References

External links

1978 births
Living people
Zambian footballers
Zambia international footballers
Nchanga Rangers F.C. players
Correcaminos UAT footballers
Lamontville Golden Arrows F.C. players
C.D. Primeiro de Agosto players
Kabuscorp S.C.P. players
C.R. Caála players
Progresso Associação do Sambizanga players
NAPSA Stars F.C. players
2002 African Cup of Nations players
2006 Africa Cup of Nations players
Doping cases in association football
Zambian sportspeople in doping cases
Association football forwards
Zambian expatriate footballers
Zambian expatriate sportspeople in Angola
Expatriate footballers in Angola
Expatriate footballers in Mexico
Zambian expatriate sportspeople in Mexico
Expatriate soccer players in South Africa
Zambian expatriate sportspeople in South Africa